Bejan may refer to:

Bejan
Bejan, Iran
Bejan, a village in Șoimuș Commune, Hunedoara County, Romania 
Adrian Bejan
Petre Bejan

Romanian-language surnames